Sean Riley is a playwright from South Australia. His plays include The Sad Ballad of Penny Dreadful (presented by Windmill Performing Arts in January 2006), My Sister Violet (seen at the Urban Myth Theatre of Youth in 2005), The Last Acre (2003), The Time of Ashes (2001) and Beautiful Words. His play The Angel & the Red Priest was performed as part of the 2008 Adelaide Festival of Arts.

References

Australian dramatists and playwrights
Living people
1967 births